A wavelength is a property of a wave.

Wavelength may also refer to:
Wavelength (album), a 1978 album by Van Morrison
"Wavelength" (song), the album's title track
Wavelength (band), a British soft rock band
Wavelength (1967 film), a film by Michael Snow
Wavelength (1983 film), a film by Mike Gray
Wavelength (magazine), a surfing magazine
WaveLength, a charitable organisation in the United Kingdom
Wavelength Music Arts Projects, a Toronto-based live music series

See also
De Broglie wavelength, the matter-wavelength associated with a massive particle